Diego et Frida is a biography of Mexican painters Diego Rivera and Frida Kahlo by French Nobel laureate J. M. G. Le Clézio. It was originally published in the French language in 1993.

Diego et Frida occupies a special place in Le Clézio's creative output: it is the only story that the writer devotes completely to artists. 

The cover art includes Kahlo's 1931 painting Frieda and Diego Rivera.

External links
Diego et Frida Éditions Stock (publisher)
DIEGO AND FRIDA

1993 non-fiction books
Essays by J. M. G. Le Clézio
French biographies
Biographies about artists
Cultural depictions of Frida Kahlo
Works by J. M. G. Le Clézio